Joe Read is an American politician and former Republican member of the Montana House of Representatives.  He represented House District 15 from 2011 to 2013, and was defeated by Frosty Boss Ribs, who he originally defeated himself in 2010, in the 2012 election. Read received attention in 2011 for introducing a bill that global warming is "beneficial to the welfare and business climate of Montana".

Personal life 
Read was born in Ronan, Montana in 1955.

References

Living people
Republican Party members of the Montana House of Representatives
Year of birth missing (living people)
21st-century American politicians